2018 Sagan Tosu season.

Squad
As of 10 July 2018.

J1 League

References

External links
 J.League official site

Sagan Tosu
Sagan Tosu seasons